Samuel Tanner (May 1, 1842 in Crawford County, Pennsylvania – ?), he moved to Westfield, Marquette County, Wisconsin in 1854. He was a member of the Wisconsin State Assembly.

Career
Tanner was a member of the Assembly in 1882 and 1883. Previously, he was Town Clerk of Westfield in 1871. He was a Democrat.

References

People from Crawford County, Pennsylvania
People from Westfield, Marquette County, Wisconsin
Democratic Party members of the Wisconsin State Assembly
City and town clerks
1842 births
Year of death missing